Akesan is the mythical founder of Iperu, an ancient town in Ogun State, South-Western Nigeria. Oral history has it that Akesan was a daughter to an Alaafin who along with her husband Ajagbe migrated from Ile Ife to finally settle in Iperu around the 13th or 14th century.

See also
Oyo Empire
Iperu Remo

References

People from Oyo State